Beaver Township is the name of two townships in the U.S. state of Indiana:

 Beaver Township, Newton County, Indiana
 Beaver Township, Pulaski County, Indiana

See also 
 Beaver Township (disambiguation)

Indiana township disambiguation pages